Abdel Hamid Fouad Gad (born 20 December 1943) is an Egyptian boxer. He competed in the men's welterweight event at the 1972 Summer Olympics in Munich. At the 1972 Summer Olympics he lost to Vladimir Kolev of Bulgaria.

References

1943 births
Living people
Egyptian male boxers
Olympic boxers of Egypt
Boxers at the 1972 Summer Olympics
Place of birth missing (living people)
Welterweight boxers
20th-century Egyptian people